God's Love We Deliver (GLWD) is an American charitable organization founded in 1985 based in New York City. Despite its name, the organization is secular. 

God's Love We Deliver volunteers prepare and deliver meals to ill New York City residents; the organization serves over 10,000 clients per year. As of 2021, GLWD had delivered 26 million meals in New York City, over the course of 35 years. The organization raises funds for its operations through a variety of means, including celebrity-endorsed fundraisers and benefits.

History
The organization stems from a visit made by Ganga Stone (1941–2021), a hospice worker, to an AIDS patient in 1985. The recognition of the difficulty that the sick had in obtaining and preparing food led to her co-founding GLWD with her roommate Jane Best. In the early days of the organization, Best and Stone delivered a few meals per day by bicycle. By 1993, GLWD was serving two meals a day to 550 clients.

In December 1995 — on World AIDS Day — the organization moved into its own home, at 166 Amsterdam Avenue in Manhattan. It had previously rented kitchen space in the American Youth Hostel at Amsterdam and 103rd Street.

In 2001, the organization expanded its mission to serve ill clients with conditions beyond HIV/AIDS.

In 2021, God's Love We Deliver budgeted for distributing 2.5 million meals to 10,000 New Yorkers who were homebound with various ailments.

See also 
 Citymeals-on-Wheels
 City Harvest
 Food Bank For New York City

References

External links
 

1985 establishments in New York City
Charities based in New York City
Food banks in New York (state)
Hunger relief organizations
Non-profit organizations based in New York City
Organizations established in 1985